Archibald Blaber (15 December 1867 – 15 May 1905) was an English cricketer who played for Sussex. He was born in Horsted Keynes and died in Cuckfield.

Blaber made two first-class appearances, both in University matches, for the side - the first in 1890 and the second in 1894. He picked up just one wicket with the ball in 25 overs of batting. Twenty-eight of the twenty-nine runs he scored in first-class cricket came when he was pushed further up the order to bat alongside three-time Test batsman Harry Butt.

Blaber appeared in two games for the Sussex Second XI in 1897.

External links
Archibald Blaber at Cricket Archive 

1867 births
1905 deaths
English cricketers
Sussex cricketers
People from Horsted Keynes